Kristin "Krissy" Moehl (born October 27, 1977) is an American ultramarathon athlete who specializes in trail running.  In 2005, Moehl became the youngest woman to complete the Grand Slam of Ultrarunning, which included a gold medal at the Vermont 100 Mile Endurance Run.

Moehl set the women's record for the Hardrock Hundred Mile Endurance Run in 2007. She holds the women's record for the fastest known run of the 170-mile Tahoe Rim Trail, completing the course in 47 hours 27 minutes.

Moehl has raced in more than 100 ultramarathons and has won several, including the Ultra-Trail du Mont-Blanc in 2003 and 2009, the Wasatch Front 100 Mile Endurance Run in 2004, and the Ultra-Trail Mt. Fuji in 2013.

In 2015, Moehl published Running Your First Ultra a guide book on Ultramarathons.

As of 2017, Moehl had been the race director for the Chuckanut 50k in Fairhaven, Washington for more than 15 years.

Personal life
Moehl was born and raised in Bow, Washington. She ran track in high school and competed at the 800-meter distance at the University of Washington. She was married to distance runner Brandon Sybrowsky from 2003 to 2006. Moehl lives in Bellingham, Washington.

Selected competition record

References

External links
Official website.

American female ultramarathon runners
1977 births
Living people
People from Bow, Washington
21st-century American women